Aramidae is a bird family in the order Gruiformes. The limpkin (Aramus guarauna) is the only living member of this family, although other species are known from the fossil record, such as Aramus paludigrus from the Middle Miocene and Badistornis aramus from Oligocene.

References

Gruiformes
Bird families
Taxa named by Charles Lucien Bonaparte